Alfred H. Hall was a footballer who played one game as a forward for Burslem Port Vale in March 1906.

Career
Hall joined Burslem Port Vale in January 1906. His Second Division debut came in a 4–0 defeat at Bristol City on 17 March. He never got picked again and was instead released from the Athletic Ground at the end of the season.

Career statistics
Source:

References

Year of birth missing
Year of death missing
English footballers
Association football forwards
Port Vale F.C. players
English Football League players